Josef Proksch or Joseph Proksch (4 August 1794, Reichenberg (now Liberec) – 20 December 1864, Prague) was a Bohemian-German pianist and composer. His daughter, Marie Proksch, was also a well-known pianist and composer.

Biography
Proksch, who became blind at the age of 13, was a pupil of Jan Antonín Koželuh. In 1830, Proksch opened the Musikbildungsanstalt (Music Academy) in Prague. His teaching method of having several students play simultaneously during piano lessons was continued for over a hundred years. His most famous student was Bedřich Smetana, whom Prosch taught piano and music theory from 1843 to 1847.

Selected works
Besides pedagogical works for piano, Proksch wrote a concerto for three pianos, piano sonatas, masses, and cantatas, and adapted numerous orchestral works to four to eight pianos for use in his lessons.

Versuch einer rationellen Lehrmethode im Pianoforte-Spiel – 50 volumes, pedagogical work (1841–1864)
Die Kunst des Ensembles im Pianoforte-Spiel – 7 volumes, pedagogical work (1859)

References

1794 births
1864 deaths
19th-century classical composers
19th-century classical pianists
Blind classical musicians
German male classical composers
German classical pianists
Male classical pianists
German music educators
Musicians from Liberec
German Romantic composers
19th-century German composers
German pianists
German male pianists
19th-century German male musicians
German Bohemian people